Robert Moretti (June 3, 1936 – May 12, 1984) was an American politician. A Democrat, Moretti served as Speaker of the California State Assembly from 1971 to 1974.

Life and career

Born in Detroit, Michigan in 1936 to Marino and Mary Moretti, his family later relocated to Los Angeles when Moretti was a teenager. Moretti's father was born in Ovindoli, Italy, and his mother was of Armenian descent. Moretti graduated from Notre Dame High School in Sherman Oaks, California in 1954 and went on to earn an accounting degree from the University of Notre Dame in 1958.

Political career
Moretti was first elected to the California State Assembly in 1964 at the age of 28, making him the youngest member of the Assembly at that time. In the Assembly, Moretti represented Van Nuys. In 1970, he chaired the Assembly's Democratic Campaign Committee.

Seen as a protege of Assembly Speaker Jesse Unruh, Moretti was first elected Speaker in 1971 and quickly emerged as a staunch opponent of Republican Governor Ronald Reagan. Moretti's initial resistance to Reagan, however, gave way some cooperation, particularly on the issue of welfare costs. Seeking to reach a deal, Moretti purportedly told Reagan, "I don't like you particularly and I know you don't like me but we don't have to be in love to work together." Moretti and Reagan eventually developed a sense of mutual respect that culminated in the 1971 California Welfare Reform Act.

In 1973, Moretti emerged as a leading figure in the successful campaign to defeat Reagan's Proposition 1, a ballot initiative to set state spending and taxes using formulas. Seen as a vehicle to enhance Reagan's national profile ahead of a possible run for president, Moretti and other opponents argued the proposition would force drastic cuts in state services and force local governments to raise property taxes.

In 1974, Moretti was a candidate for the office of Governor of California but was defeated in the Democratic primary by Jerry Brown, who went on to win the general election.

Death

Moretti died of a heart attack while playing tennis in 1984 at the age of 47.

References

Further reading
 Burbank, Garin. "Speaker Moretti, Governor Reagan, and the Search for Tax Reform in California, 1970-1972." Pacific Historical Review 61.2 (1992): 193–214. online free
 Burbank, Garin. "Governor Reagan's Only Defeat: The Proposition 1 Campaign in 1973." California History 72.4 (1993): 360–373. online
 Burbank, Garin. "Governor Reagan and California Welfare Reform: The Grand Compromise of 1971." California History  70.3 (1991): 278–289.
 Mitchell, Daniel JB. "Governor Reagan's ballot box budgeting: One that got away." Southern California Quarterly 89.2 (2007): 195–227. online

External links
Resolution establishing Moretti Memorial
JoinCalifornia - Bob Moretti

1936 births
1984 deaths
Speakers of the California State Assembly
Democratic Party members of the California State Assembly
20th-century American politicians
American people of Armenian descent
American people of Italian descent
Ethnic Armenian politicians
Politicians from Detroit